Masako (written: , ,  or  in hiragana) is a feminine Japanese given name. Notable people with the name include:

, (1888–1940), 6th daughter of Emperor Meiji
, Japanese long-distance runner
, Japanese voice actress
, Japanese linguist
, Japanese architect
, later known as the "Nun Shogun"
, Japanese speed skater
, Japanese voice actress
, Japanese cross-country skier
, Japanese voice actress
, Japanese figure skater
, Japanese voice actress
, Japanese carom billiards player
, Japanese middle-distance runner
, (1552–1589), posthumous name of Lady Saigō, first consort of Tokugawa Ieyasu
, a voice actress
, Japanese politician
, Japanese enka singer and former 1970s idol
, Japanese novelist
, Japanese lawyer
, later Crown Princess Bangja of Korea
, Japanese actress
, Japanese voice actress
, Japanese politician
, Japanese field hockey player
, Japanese ice hockey player
, Japanese table tennis player
, former princess of Japan and daughter of Prince Mikasa
, Japanese voice actress
, 5th daughter of Tokugawa Hidetada, the 2nd Tokugawa Shogun
, Japanese announcer
, Japanese manga artist
, Japanese women's footballer

Japanese feminine given names

Fictional characters
Masako Kaneko
Colonel Masako, main antagonist in the video-game Red Faction
Lady Masako Adachi, a character in the video-game Ghost of Tsushima
Masako Garmadon, a character from LEGO Ninjago series

See also
MasakoX, Internet personality and voice actor

Japanese feminine given names